Nice attack may refer to:
 2003 Nice bombing
 2015 Nice stabbing
 2016 Nice truck attack
 2020 Nice stabbing